"I'm Gonna Be Ready" is a song by American singer Yolanda Adams. The song was a single from her 2001 studio album Believe, her last album with major record label Elektra Records. The song charted on the US Billboard Adult R&B Songs chart, peaking at number 10. The song was heavily played on urban gospel radio.

Charts

References

2001 singles
2001 songs
Elektra Records singles
Songs written by Jimmy Jam and Terry Lewis
Yolanda Adams songs
Songs written by Yolanda Adams